The 1978–79 UCLA Bruins men's basketball team represented the University of California, Los Angeles in the 1978–79 NCAA Division I men's basketball season.  Gary Cunningham began his second year and final year as head coach. The Bruins started the season ranked 2nd in the nation (AP Poll). The Bruins started the season 3–0 before losing to #3 Notre Dame. UCLA's team finished 1st in the Pac-10 regular season. UCLA participated the NCAA Tournament where they reached the Regional Final before losing 95–91 to DePaul (a team the Bruins had beaten in their second game of the season).

Starting lineup

Roster

Schedule

|-
!colspan=9 style=|Regular Season

|-
!colspan=12 style="background:#;"| NCAA Tournament

Rankings

^Coaches did not release Week 1 or Week 2 polls.

NBA draft

Notes
David Greenwood will be inducted into the National Collegiate Basketball Hall of Fame as a member of the Class of 2021

References

UCLA Bruins men's basketball seasons
UCLA
UCLA
UCLA
UCLA